Brydan Klein and Dane Propoggia were the defending champions but Klein decided not to participate, Propoggia chose to play with Stefano Ianni and lost in the semifinals to Gianluigi Quinzi and Adelchi Virgili. Quinzi and Virgili lost in the final to Ken Skupski and Neal Skupski 6–4, 6–2.

Seeds

Draw

Draw

References
 Main Draw

Guzzini Challenger- Doubles
2013 Doubles